Varina may refer to:

People
 Varina Davis (1826–1906), first and only First Lady of the Confederate States of America
 Varina Anne Davis (1864–1898), American author, daughter of Jefferson and Varina Davis
 Varina Tjon-A-Ten (born 1952), Dutch politician

Places in the United States
 Varina, Iowa, a city
 Varina, North Carolina, a constituent town merged in 1963 to form Fuquay-Varina, North Carolina
 Varina, Virginia, a magisterial district in the easternmost portion of Henrico County, Virginia
 Varina Farms, a plantation established by John Rolfe on the James River

Other uses
 Varina (moth), a genus of moths of the family Noctuidae
 Varina High School, Henrico County, Virginia
 USCS Varina, a United States Coast Survey schooner from 1854–1875
 Varina, a 2018 novel by Charles Frazier

See also
 Verena (disambiguation)
 Verina (died 484), Empress of the Byzantine Empire, consort of Leo I
 Verina Morton Jones (1865–1943), African-American physician, suffragist and clubwoman
 Veriña, a district in the municipality of Gijón / Xixón, Asturias, Spain
 Varinia, Spartacus's love interest in the 1960 film Spartacus

Feminine given names